Tarangan is one of the Aru languages, spoken by inhabitants of the Aru Islands in eastern Indonesia. There are two varieties of Tarangan: East and West Tarangan. These varieties are divergent, perhaps no closer than they are to Manombai, also spoken in the Arus. West Tarangan is a trade language of the southern islands.

Phonology 
The following is the description for West Tarangan:

Consonants 

  can occur as a glottal  intervocalically between two non-high vowels.
  is heard as a stop  syllable-final position.
  are heard as voiced stops [ ] in word-initial position and within a stressed noninitial syllable onset.

Vowels 

  in unstressed positions are heard as [ ].
 Sounds  are phonetically .

References

Aru languages
Languages of Indonesia